Søgne Church is a parish church of the Church of Norway in Kristiansand Municipality in Agder county, Norway. It is located in the village of Lunde, just west of Tangvall. It is the church for the Søgne parish which is part of the Kristiansand domprosti (arch-deanery) in the Diocese of Agder og Telemark. The white, wooden church was built in a cruciform design in 1861 using plans drawn up by the architect Christian H. Grosch. The church seats about 750 people. Inside, the church has balcony seating along all the walls leading up to the chancel. The chancel floor is raised three steps above the floor of the nave.

History
The church was consecrated on 29 November 1861.

See also
List of churches in Agder og Telemark

References

Churches in Kristiansand
Wooden churches in Norway
Cruciform churches in Norway
19th-century Church of Norway church buildings
Churches completed in 1861
1861 establishments in Norway